Polycarpus I (Greek: Πολύκαρπος Αʹ), (? – 89) was a bishop of Byzantium. He succeeded Bishop Onesimus in 69 AD, and served in that office until his death in 89 AD. His last eight years of office (from 81 AD) were during Emperor Domitian's persecution of the Christians.  His relics are deposited in the Cathedral of Argyropolis.

References 

89 deaths
1st-century Romans
1st-century Byzantine bishops
Bishops of Byzantium
Year of birth unknown